Khams al-Wadi al-Awsat is a sub-district located in Sanhan and Bani Bahlul District, Sana'a Governorate, Yemen. Khams al-Wadi al-Awsat had a population of 4176 according to the 2004 census.

References 

Sub-districts in Sanhan and Bani Bahlul District